A battle zone or battlezone is the location of a battle.

Battle Zone or Battlezone may also refer to:

Games

Battlezone franchise 
 Battlezone (1980 video game), an arcade game from Atari
 Battlezone (1998 video game), a first-person shooter/real-time strategy game from Activision
 Battlezone (2008 video game), a remake of the arcade game from Stainless Games
 Battlezone (2016 video game), a multiplayer virtual reality game from Rebellion Developments

Other games
 BZFlag (aka Battle Zone: Capture The Flag), an interactive computer game in which tanks play capture the flag
 Battle Zone, the active playing area of Duel Masters Trading Card Game

Music 
 Paul Di'Anno's Battlezone, a British heavy rock band
 Battle Zone, a song by Raven from their 1982 album Wiped Out
 Battle Zones, a song by Jag Panzer from their 2003 album Decade of the Nail Spiked Bat

Other uses 
 Battle Zone, a Friday segment on Canadian children's show The Zone
 Youngblood Battlezone, a series of comic books
 Battle Zone (film), a 1952 Korean War war film
 Battle Zone, a periodic dancing competition organized by Tommy the Clown